General elections were held in the New Hebrides on 14 November 1979, the last before independence the following year. The result was a victory for the Vanua'aku Pati, which won 25 of the 39 seats, with its partner party Natui Tanno winning one. Voter turnout was 90.3%.

Background
Prior to the elections, the New Hebrides Federal Party was formed by former members of Tanunion and Natatok, as well as members of Nagriamel.

Electoral system
The 39 members of the legislature were elected from 15 constituencies.

Results

Aftermath
After it was announced that the Vanua'aku Pati had also won a majority on the regional assembly election of Espiritu Santo were announced, supporters of Nagriamel and Tabwemasana took to the streets with weapons to tell immigrants to leave the island. Almost 360 people took sanctuary in the Anglican church compound and around 350–500 people fled the island.

On 29 November the Representative Assembly elected Walter Lini as Chief Minister. Lini received 26 votes, defeating Gérard Leymang who received three; three members abstained and seven MHAs from Espiritu Santo boycotted the session, claiming there had been electoral fraud.

See also
List of members of the Parliament of Vanuatu (1979–1983)

References

Elections in Vanuatu
1970s in Vanuatu
1979 election
New Hebrides
November 1979 events in Oceania